This page describes the qualifying procedure for the 1999 UEFA European Under-16 Football Championship. 49 teams were divided into 15 groups of three and four teams each. The fifteen best winners advanced to the final tournament.

Matches

Group 1

Group 2

Group 3

Group 4

Group 5

Group 6

Group 7

Group 8

Group 9

Group 10

Group 11

Group 12

Group 13

Group 14

Group 15

References
UEFA.com
RSSSF.com

UEFA European Under-17 Championship qualification
Qualifying